The To Do List is a 2013 American romantic comedy film written and directed by Maggie Carey in her feature film directorial debut, starring Aubrey Plaza, Johnny Simmons, Bill Hader, Alia Shawkat, Sarah Steele, Scott Porter, Rachel Bilson, Christopher Mintz-Plasse, Andy Samberg, Donald Glover, Connie Britton, and Clark Gregg. The film centers on a recent high school graduate (Plaza) who feels she needs to have more sexual experiences before she starts college.

The film was released in the United States on July 26, 2013, by CBS Films.

Plot
Brandy Klark is from Boise, Idaho, and is an overachieving but socially awkward girl who graduates as the valedictorian of her high school in 1993. After the ceremony, Brandy's two best friends, Wendy and Fiona, take Brandy to a party, where she gets drunk for the first time. Brandy makes out with a muscular college boy she has a crush on named Rusty Waters. Since the room is dark, he mistakes Brandy for someone else and when he realizes who she is, he rejects her. Brandy blames her lack of sexual experience and resolves to learn all about sex over the summer to prepare for college. She decides that her end-of-summer goal will be to have sex with Rusty to complete her "To Do List".

Brandy gets a job at the pool as a lifeguard to be close to Rusty and her study-buddy Cameron Mitchell. As the newbie, she is hazed by her slacker boss, Willy and her other co-workers by being given the most unpleasant jobs. Brandy is told to clean waste from the pool that appears to be feces. She assumes her co-workers are playing a prank on her, based on the Baby Ruth joke from the film Caddyshack, so she takes a bite only to find out it is actual feces. As revenge, she pushes Willy, who does not know how to swim, into the pool. She agrees to teach him how to swim in exchange for ending the hazing.

Brandy gets advice from her sister, Amber, her mother, and her two best friends, while her father, a conservative judge, is uncomfortable with the talk of sex. Using this information, she makes a "to do list" of sexual acts to learn and perform. As the summer progresses, Brandy has several sexual encounters with Cameron and other boys, all while trying to catch Rusty's eye. Cameron begins to fall in love with her but is crushed after discovering her list and realizing he was just part of her "mission". Willy catches Brandy, Wendy, Fiona, and members of a male grunge band in the pool after hours. Brandy is sent home where she is confronted by Cameron over the list. Cameron leaves in a huff and Brandy cries. Duffy, whom Wendy has a crush on, comes over to comfort Brandy and the two hook up.

When Wendy and Fiona come over to watch the film Beaches with Brandy, they discover her list and see the list of boys with whom she had experimented. They get upset after finding out that Brandy hooked up with one of their crushes and leave angrily. They declare that Brandy has failed to put "Bros before hoes" and call her a slut.

Brandy finally gets close to Rusty when they vandalize a rival pool, but they get caught because Brandy leaves her bra, which has her name on it, and Willy fires her. Brandy asks out Rusty, and he takes her to a popular make-out spot to have sex, but the sex is brief and disappointing. She sees her father and mother in the Dodge Caravan next to them having sex, causing her to freak out and demand that Rusty take her home immediately.

Willy goes to the Klark house to stop Brandy from having sex with Rusty, but is met at the door by Amber, who seduces him. When Rusty and Brandy arrive home, a jealous Cameron is there to meet him with a sucker-punch, and they fight until Brandy breaks it up. She compliments them on their good qualities, apologizes sincerely to Cameron for using him, and offers her own view of sex.

Afterward, she seeks out Wendy and Fiona to apologize to them. She sings "Wind Beneath My Wings" at Wendy's door, and the two girls eventually join in, forgiving her. Brandy meets  with Willy at the pool, and he offers her his job if she comes back next summer—as he has quit to follow the Grateful Dead.

In the fall, Brandy and Cameron meet again at Georgetown University. Brandy apologizes to Cameron. They have various forms of sex, and Brandy finally achieves orgasm, the last thing on her list, through anal sex, just as her father walks in on them. Very embarrassing scene for everyone.

Cast
 Aubrey Plaza as Brandy Klark
 Johnny Simmons as Cameron Mitchell
 Bill Hader as Willy McLean
 Scott Porter as Rusty Waters
 Alia Shawkat as Fiona Forster
 Sarah Steele as Wendy Summers
 Rachel Bilson as Amber Klark
 Christopher Mintz-Plasse as Duffy
 Andy Samberg as Van King
 Connie Britton as Jean Klark
 Clark Gregg as Judge George Klark
 Donald Glover as Derrick Murphy
 Adam Pally as Chip
 Jack McBrayer as Oakcrest Pool Manager
 Nolan Gould as Max
 Bryce Clyde Jenkins as Benji
 Kevin M. Brennan as Guitar Player, Van's Band
 Zachary Ross as Drummer, Van's Band
 Scott Davidson as Bass, Van's Band
 Brian Huskey as Principal
 D.C. Pierson as Hillcrest Lifeguard #1
 Dominic Dierkas as Hillcrest Lifeguard #2
 Liz Cackowski as Aerobics Instructor
 Skyler Vallo as Hot Girl At Party
 Chrystal Harris as Stripper
 Lauren Lapkus as Girl Heckler

Production
The script was originally entitled The Handjob. The film was rejected by studios, but ended up on the "blacklist" of the most popular unproduced scripts of 2010. A live table reading of the script at the Austin Film Festival led CBS Films to produce the project.

Reception

Box office
During the film's first weekend, The To Do List earned $1,579,402 from 591 theaters, opening in 15th place. This was below expectations; the Los Angeles Times predicted an opening weekend of $2–3 million, and CBS Films was expecting $2 million.

Critical response
The To Do List received mixed reviews, holding a 54% rating on review aggregation website Rotten Tomatoes, based on 117 reviews, with an average rating of 5.75/10. The site's critical consensus reads: "The To Do List may play things disappointingly safe given its rather daring premise, but writer-director Maggie Carey's sure hand – and Aubrey Plaza's performance – keep the laughs coming." On Metacritic, the film has a weighted average score of 61 out of 100, based on reviews from 40 critics.

Plaza's role as Brandy Klark was praised by film critic Alan Scherstuhl, of The Village Voice, who wrote "unlike for the female characters in previous sex comedies, sex for her is a straight-up choice, something she offers or refuses according to no agenda but her own", but notes that "there's something dispiriting about [the film's] junky look, indifferent pacing, and sketch-comedy characterization."

On a more critical front, Rafer Guzman of Newsday gave the film one out of four stars, calling it "a fake feminist comedy that pays lip service to female empowerment but inadvertently makes sex seem both demeaning and meaningless," as well as "Vulgar, cynical and rarely funny." Paul Doro of the Milwaukee Journal Sentinel criticized the film for its extreme raunchiness, which he found to be unneeded; he named the film "an absurdly profane comedy that spends its entire time serving up filthy jokes and then trying to top them".

See also

References

External links
 
 
 
 

2013 films
2013 black comedy films
2013 directorial debut films
2013 independent films
2013 romantic comedy films
2010s coming-of-age comedy films
2010s sex comedy films
2010s teen comedy films
2010s teen romance films
American black comedy films
American coming-of-age comedy films
American independent films
American romantic comedy films
American sex comedy films
American teen comedy films
American teen romance films
Coming-of-age romance films
2010s English-language films
Films about virginity
Films set in 1993
Films set in Idaho
Films shot in Los Angeles
Teen sex comedy films
2010s American films